Peter Charles "Chas" Alecxih III (born February 10, 1989) is an American football defensive tackle who is currently a free agent. He played college football at University of Pittsburgh.

Professional career

Miami Dolphins
Alexih was signed as an undrafted rookie free agent by Miami on May 4, 2012. He spent the entire season, with the exception of Week 1, on the Dolphins' practice squad.

He was waived with an injury settlement on May 21, 2013.

Kansas City Chiefs
He was initially signed as a free agent by Kansas City on January 6, 2014. He was waived at the conclusion of organized team activities by the Chiefs on June 19, 2014.

San Diego Chargers
Alecxih was claimed off waivers by the San Diego Chargers on June 20, 2014. He spent the entire season on the Chargers' practice squad.

The Chargers waived him on March 31, 2015.

Carolina Panthers
On May 20, 2015, Alecxih signed as a free agent with the Carolina Panthers after attending the team's rookie minicamp as a tryout player. On September 5, 2015, he was released by the Panthers. Two days later, he signed with the Panthers' practice squad.

On February 7, 2016, Alecxih's Panthers played in Super Bowl 50. In the game, the Panthers fell to the Denver Broncos by a score of 24–10.

On February 9, 2016, Alecxih signed a futures contract with the Carolina Panthers.

On August 9, 2016, Alecxih was waived/injured by the Panthers and was placed on injured reserve after clearing waivers.

References

External links
Pittsburgh Panthers bio 
Carolina Panthers bio

Living people
1989 births
American football defensive tackles
Players of American football from Pennsylvania
Sportspeople from Lancaster, Pennsylvania
Pittsburgh Panthers football players
Miami Dolphins players
San Diego Chargers players
Carolina Panthers players